Alexander Frederick Henry Debnam (12 October 1921 – 26 January 2003), known as Alec Debnam, was an English cricketer and member of the Royal Air Force. Debnam was a right-handed batsman who bowled leg-breaks and googlies.

Cricket career
After playing Second XI cricket in 1946 and 1947, Debnam made his first-class cricket debut for Kent County Cricket Club against Sussex in the 1948 County Championship at Tunbridge Wells. He played a total of 11 times for the Kent First XI during 1948 and 1949, taking the wickets of five of Gloucestershire's top six batsmen in 1949, his only five wicket haul.

In 1950 Debnam joined Hampshire, making his debut against Yorkshire. He played 10 first-class matches for Hampshire, with his final appearance for the county coming in 1951 against Lancashire.

After his first-class career, Debnam re-joined the Royal Air Force. He died at Newcastle upon Tyne in Northumberland on 26 January 2003 aged 81.

References

External links

1921 births
2003 deaths
People from Belvedere, London
English cricketers
Kent cricketers
Hampshire cricketers
20th-century Royal Air Force personnel